The Brit Award for British Group is an award given by the British Phonographic Industry (BPI), an organisation which represents record companies and artists in the United Kingdom. The accolade is presented at the Brit Awards, an annual celebration of British and international music. The winners and nominees are determined by the Brit Awards voting academy with over 1,000 members, which comprise record labels, publishers, managers, agents, media, and previous winners and nominees.

The inaugural recipients of the award are The Beatles, who won in 1977. Coldplay hold the record for most wins in the category, with four, while Radiohead hold the record for most nominations without a win, with seven. In 2021, Little Mix became the first women to win the award, though virtual band Gorillaz, who won in 2018, do feature Noodle, a fictional female member. The current holder of the award is Wet Leg, who won in 2023.

History
The award was first presented in 1977 and was first won by the Beatles. When the second Brit awards were held, the Police received the honour and the award had been given out to one group annually since 1982. The only exception to this was in 1992, when the KLF and Simply Red were revealed to have tied and, as such, both groups were announced as winners. Damon Albarn is the only individual to have been nominated for work in multiple groups, receiving four nominations (including one win) as a member of Blur, and five nominations (including one win) as a member of Gorillaz. In 2021 Little Mix, made history when they became the first female group to win the award since it was first presented in 1977. The group took to call out the award ceremony and the music industry over white male dominance, the lack of nominations and wins for female groups in the category and paid homage to previous girl group nominees.

Winners and nominees

Groups with multiple wins

Groups with multiple nominations

Notes
 Oasis (1995), Arctic Monkeys (2006) also won Brit Award for Best New Artist
 The Verve (1998) also won Brit Award for British Producer of the Year
 The Darkness (2004), Franz Ferdinand (2005), Kaiser Chiefs (2006) also won Brit Award for British Rock Act
 Kaiser Chiefs (2006), Take That (2008), Coldplay (2013) also won Brit Award for British Live Act

References

Brit Awards
Awards established in 1977
Awards established in 1982
Awards disestablished in 1977